Boscá's newt (Lissotriton boscai, formerly Triturus boscai ), also known as the Iberian newt, is a species of newt in the family Salamandridae. The species is found in Portugal and western Spain.

Etymology
The specific name boscai is in honor of Spanish herpetologist Eduardo Boscá.

Description
The female is up to 94 millimeters long and the male up to 75 millimeters. There are glandular ridges along the back and the skin is granular in texture when the newt is living out of water. The body is brownish, yellowish, or dull green with dark spotting. The belly is orange. Unlike some of its congeners, this species is not especially showy during the breeding season. The male develops a brightly colored protuberance at the tip of the tail.

Distribution and habitat
This newt is mostly aquatic, living in shallow ponds and streams lined with vegetation. It can be found in disturbed and artificial water bodies, such as ditches. It is known from oak woodland habitat, scrub, sandy coastal strips, and farms and plantations.

Conservation
Populations are stable and the species is not considered to be threatened, but in some areas it experiences losses due to the destruction and degradation of its aquatic habitat.

References

Further reading
Arnold EN, Burton JA. 1978. A Field Guide to the Reptiles and Amphibians of Britain and Europe. London: Collins. 272 pp. + Plates 1-40. . (Triturus boscai, pp. 51–52 + Plate 4 + Map 16).
Tourneville A. 1879. "Description d'une nouvelle espèce de batracien urodèle d'Espagne ( Pelonectes boscai Lataste) ". Bulletin de la Société Zoologique de France 4: 69–87. ("Pelonectes boscai Lataste", new species). (in French).

Lissotriton
Endemic amphibians of the Iberian Peninsula
Amphibians described in 1879
Amphibians of Europe
Taxonomy articles created by Polbot